The 1926–27 Lancashire Cup was the nineteenth competition in the history of this regional rugby league contest and another new name was added to the trophy. It was the turn of St. Helens, one of the founding members of the Northern Union, to lift the trophy and until this year had never even reached the final of the competition. In a local derby match St. Helens beat very near neighbours St Helens Recs by 10–2. The match was played at Wilderspool, Warrington. The attendance was 19,439 and receipts £1192.

For the first time in the competition, both semi-finals resulted in draws and required replays.

Background 
The number of teams entering this year's competition increased by one to 14 which resulted in 2 byes in the first round.  The additional team were amateur side Pemberton Rovers.

Competition and results

Round 1  
Involved  6 matches (with two byes) and 14 clubs

Round 2 – quarterfinals

Round 3 – semifinals

Final

Teams and scorers 

Scoring - Try = three (3) points - Goal = two (2) points - Drop goal = two (2) points

The road to success

See also 
1926–27 Northern Rugby Football League season

Notes 
 1 Pemberton Rovers were a Junior (amateur) club from Wigan.
 2 Wilderspool was the home ground of Warrington from 1883 to the end of the 2003 Summer season.

References

RFL Lancashire Cup
Lancashire Cup